Kostandin is an Albanian masculine given name. Individuals bearing the name Kostandin include:
Kostandin of Berta (fl. 18th century), writer and translator
Kostandin Boshnjaku (1888–1953), banker, politician
Kostandin Çekrezi (1892–1959), patriot, historian, and publicist
Kostandin Kariqi (born 1996), footballer
Kostandin Kristoforidhi (1826–1895), translator and scholar
Kostandin Ndoni (born 1989), footballer
Kostandin Shpataraku (1736–1767), painter  
Kostandin Zografi (fl. 18th century), painter

References

Albanian masculine given names